Empedrado may refer to:

 Empedrado, Chile
 Empedrado, Corrientes
 Empedrado Department
 Fundo Pichilemo de Empedrado